The 71st Writers Guild of America Awards honored the best in film, television, radio and video-game writing of 2018. Winners were announced on February 17, 2019 at the Beverly Hilton Hotel, Beverly Hills, California and the Edison Ballroom, New York City, New York. The nominations for Television, New Media, Radio, News and Promotional Writing were announced on December 6, 2018. The Theatrical, Documentary Screenplay and Videogame Writing nominees were announced on January 7, 2019.

Winners and nominees

Film

Television

Documentary

News

Radio

Promotional Writing

Videogame Writing

Special awards

References

External links 
 

2018
2018 film awards
2018 in American cinema
2018 in American television
2018 television awards
2018 guild awards
2018 awards in the United States
February 2019 events in the United States